Keith LeMon Washington (born December 18, 1972 in Dallas, Texas) is a former American football defensive end who played nine seasons in the National Football League for the Detroit Lions, Baltimore Ravens, Denver Broncos, and the New York Giants.  He played college football at the University of Nevada-Las Vegas.

External links
NFL.com player page

1972 births
Living people
Players of American football from Dallas
American football defensive ends
Hinds Eagles football players
UNLV Rebels football players
Detroit Lions players
Baltimore Ravens players
Denver Broncos players
New York Giants players